Alterface Projects is a manufacturer of interactive and media-based attractions, which offers interactive technologies and turnkey entertainment solutions. Founded in 2001 and headquartered in Belgium, Europe, Alterface operates globally, having a US office and Asian branches in Beijing and Xiamen, China. Alterface creates and builds turnkey interactive mixed-media attractions for dark rides, spinning & dueling theatres and walkthroughs.

History 
Founded in 2001, Alterface debuted as a spin-off of the University of Louvain-La-Neuve (UCL) active in the field of creation of interactive systems.

Products 
Alterface develops products such as the Salto! show control management software, 3D and 4D shooting devices, and the non-linear & scalable Erratic Ride. The ride concept Action League combines tournament, interactive gaming and motion.

Notable attractions and projects

 Popcorn Revenge (2019, Walibi Belgium) : Erratic® Ride featuring vehicles from ETF Ride Systems and theming design by Joravision. This interactive dark ride received numerous awards, including the Thea Award for Outstanding Achievement, Park World Excellence Award, European Star Award.
 Le Kinétorium (2018, Jardin d'Acclimatation, France) : Interactive Theatre
 Basilisk (2018, Legendia, Poland) : Interactive dark ride featuring vehicles from ETF Ride Systems and theming design by Joravision. In 2018 a range of prestigious awards have been allocated to the Basilisk interactive dark ride, including the Thea Award for Outstanding Achievement, Asia Attraction Crown Award, Park World Excellence Award, European Star Award.
 Investiture of Gods (2019, Qingdao Oriental Movie Metropolis, China) : Interactive Indoor Roller Coaster.
 Splashing UFO Rapid River (2016, Yomiuri Land, Japan) : Interactive Raft Ride.
Maus au Chocolat (2011, Phantasialand, Germany) : Interactive dark ride featuring vehicles from ETF Ride Systems 42 3D back projection screens, on screen shooting. Interaction software, show control system and overall design were provided by Alterface Projects, turnkey of the project.
Dragons Wild Shooting (2013, Lotte World, South Korea) : Interactive dark ride featuring trackless vehicles from ETF Ride Systems, shooting at screens and at moving and non-moving scenery (animatronics). All shooting targets are invisible, which helps keeping the theming free from visible, disruptive technology. Alterface Projects provided the interaction software and overall show control system. Overall design and art direction was provided by The Hettema Group.
Justice League: Alien Invasion 3D (2012, Warner Bros. Movie World, Australia) : Interactive dark-ride based on DC Comics' Juctice League intellectual property. It features shooting at 3D screens and at moving and non-moving scenery (animatronics). Alterface Projects provided the interaction software and overall show control system. Overall design and art direction was provided by Sally Corporation.
Justice League: Battle for Metropolis (2015, Six Flags Over Texas and Six Flags St. Louis, United States) : Interactive dark-ride based on DC Comics' Juctice League intellectual property. It features motion-based vehicles from Oceaneering International, shooting at 3D screens and at moving and non-moving scenery (animatronics). Alterface Projects provided the interaction software and overall show control system. Overall design and art direction was provided by Sally Corporation.
Plants vs. Zombies: Garden Warfare 3Z Arena (2016, Carowinds, United States) : Interactive dark ride based on Electronic Arts and PopCap Games' Plants vs. Zombies intellectual property. It features motion-based seats and shooting at 3D screens. Alterface Projects provided the interaction software and overall show control system.

References

External links

 Alterface projects

Software companies of Belgium
Technology companies established in 2001
Wavre
Companies based in Walloon Brabant